Sky Commanders is an animated television series made by Hanna-Barbera with the co-production of Toei Animation. It premiered in July 1987 as part of The Funtastic World of Hanna-Barbera and lasted for thirteen episodes. It was based on the action figure line from Kenner Toys.

Plot

The storyline of Sky Commanders comprises the daily adventures of a multi-national group of soldiers and mountaineering specialists from all over the world who battle the evil General Lucas Plague and his goon squad of villainous mercenaries and miscreants, "The Raiders", whose aim is to seize control of the planet. The series is set on a new continent deep in the South Pacific, which was created by the emergence to the surface world of a new and powerful, unstable radioactive element, called "Phaeta  Seven" (θ-7).

This lethal energy source can only be stabilized for containment by exposure to temperatures of −200 °F (−128.89 °C). It is known that whoever can control the element and harness its enormous power would be the ruler of the world; a goal that the amoral General Plague wants strongly. It is up to General Mike Summit and his highly trained soldiers to stop him.

Complicating the Sky Commanders' objective of stopping the criminal ambitions of the Raiders is the fact the new continent (collectively referred to in the series as "The High Frontier") is routinely beset by sporadic, unstable and highly dangerous weather conditions and environmental hazards, such as: landslides, earthquakes, cave-ins, whirlpools, etc. There is also the need for monthly shipments of fresh supplies, new advanced technology and weapon systems. Constant attack by the scheming and underhanded Raiders and the aforementioned environmental dangers make the Sky Commanders's mission only that much more dangerous.

Travel throughout the new continent is only possible by means of high-altitude flight, or by using Laser Cables: a specialized version of a rappelling cord emitted from combat backpacks worn by both Raider and Sky Commander. When used, the cables shoot out from the combat backpacks in the form of energy beams. When contact is made with a solid object, the Laser Cable solidifies into a solid metal cable line upon which travel is possible.

Phaeta Seven, the radioactive element that both sides fight to control, came from the deepest subterranean recesses of Earth itself, and it has brought with it, on its rise to the surface of Earth, not only the new continent itself, but also a wild and voracious, bizarre menagerie of utterly horrific creatures to inhabit it. These lifeforms are either the products of long-term mutative exposure to Phaeta Seven's radiation, or were just naturally brought about the way that they are. Occasional violent encounters with these monstrosities is yet another danger waiting for both sides of this battle for the future freedom or enslavement of the world.

List of episodes

Characters

Sky Commanders
 Bob Ridgely as General Mike Summit, leader of the Sky Commanders
 William Windom as "Cutter" Kling, a man whose daughter is missing and is reportedly on the new continent.
 Soon-Tek Oh as Kodiak, an Eskimo man
 Tristan Rogers as "Spider" Reilly, an Australian man
 Richard Doyle as "Books" Baxter, a Canadian man and electronics expert
 Dorian Harewood as Jim Stryker, a Jamaican man
 Lauren Tewes as Red McCullough, an Irish woman
 Darryl Hickman as R.J. Scott, the youngest Sky Commander

Raiders
 Bernard Erhard as General Lucas Plague, leader of the Raiders
 B.J. Ward as Dr. Erica Slade, the scientist of the Raiders
 Charlie Adler as Kreeg, the green-haired Raider
 Paul Eiding as Raider Rath, the black-haired Raider
 Dick Gautier as Mordax, the stout Raider and Plague's brother-in-law

Home media
On August 28, 2012, Warner Archive released Sky Commanders: The Complete Series on DVD in region 1 as part of their Hanna-Barbera Classics Collection. This is a Manufacture-on-Demand (MOD) release, available exclusively through Warner's online store and Amazon.com.

See also

 List of animated television series

References

External links
 
 Sky Commanders @ Retrojunk.com
 Sky Commanders @ Big Cartoon Database
 Sky Commanders Toy wiki @ virtualtoychest.com

1980s American animated television series
1980s toys
1987 American television series debuts
1987 American television series endings
American children's animated action television series
American children's animated adventure television series
American children's animated science fiction television series
Anime-influenced Western animated television series
English-language television shows
Fictional special forces personnel
Fictional military organizations
Fictional soldiers
The Funtastic World of Hanna-Barbera
Television series by Hanna-Barbera
Television shows based on Hasbro toys
Television shows set in San Francisco
Toei Animation television